Matson is an unincorporated community in southern St. Charles County, Missouri, United States. It is located approximately three miles south of Defiance on Route 94 and is near the Missouri River.

History 
A post office called Matson was established in 1893, and remained in operation until 1971. The community most likely has the name of Abraham Matson, a pioneer citizen.

References

Unincorporated communities in St. Charles County, Missouri
Missouri populated places on the Missouri River
Unincorporated communities in Missouri